Typhlochactidae is a family of troglomorphic scorpions native to eastern Mexico.

Overview of genera 
Subfamily: Alacraninae
 Genus Alacran
Subfamily: Typhlochactinae
 Genus Sotanochactas
 Genus Stygochactas
 Genus Typhlochactas

References

External links 
 

 
Scorpion families
Endemic scorpions of Mexico